Old Road Football Club is an Antiguan football team playing in the Antigua and Barbuda Premier Division. The club is based in Old Road, Antigua.

History
Old Road are a two time champion of the Antigua and Barbuda Premier Division, most recently in 2012–13.

Former players

  Luciano Cigno

Achievements
Antigua and Barbuda Premier Division
Champions (2): 2011–12, 2012–13
Runners-up (1): 2009–10

References

Football clubs in Antigua and Barbuda